Hwang Te-Song (born December 20, 1989) is a South Korean football player.

Club statistics

References

External links

1989 births
Living people
Keio University alumni
Association football people from Gunma Prefecture
South Korean footballers
South Korean expatriate footballers
J2 League players
Kyoto Sanga FC players
Expatriate footballers in Japan
South Korean expatriate sportspeople in Japan
Association football defenders